Hiles is a town in Wood County, Wisconsin, United States. Its population was 188 at the 2000 census.

Geography
According to the United States Census Bureau, Hiles has an area of 35.3 square miles (91.5 km2), of which 34.8 square miles (90.2 km2) is land and 0.5 square miles (1.2 km2) of it (1.36%) is water.

History
The six-mile square that would become Hiles was first surveyed in the summer of 1851 by a crew working for the US government. Around New Year's Day of 1852, another crew marked all of its the section corners of the six-mile square, traversing the woods and swamps, measuring with chain and compass. The deputy surveyor filed this general description:
The surface of this Township is level, about one half is composed of Tamarack Swamp, the remaining Portion low wetland, but a small Portion could be made fit for cultivation (?) by drainage. The whole surface is covered with a very thick coat of Timber Small(?) Pine, Tamarack, Maple and Birch, undergrowth of Alder witch Hazel, and water Bech very thick, soil Hard Pan from the Middle of the Township North and East local attraction was found to very considerable extent, so much so that several lines were run with back sights(?) and measurement alone, Fox River (called by residents East Branch of Black River.) runs near the Center of the Township – from the N.E. to N.W. corner, average width 100 links Rapid(?) current, average depth about two feet.

The current town of Hiles was organized in 1901. It was named for businessman and land speculator George Hiles, who owned half of the town's the land before the turn of the century.

Demographics
As of the 2000 census, there were 188 people, 63 households, and 51 families in Hiles, and its population density was 5.4 people per square mile (2.1/km2).  There were 88 housing units, with an average density of 2.5 per square mile (1.0/km2). Its racial makeup was 97.87% White, 2.66% Hispanic, 0.53% African American, 0.53% from other races, and 1.06% from two or more races.

There were 63 households, out of which 42.9% had children under the age of 18; 77.8% were married couples living together, 4.8% had a female householder with no husband present, and 17.5% were non-families. 15.9% of households consisted of individuals, with 11.1% 65 years of age or older. The average household size was 2.98 people, and the average family size 3.31.

33.5% of residents were 18 or younger, 3.7% were 18–24, 28.7% were 25–44, 20.2% were 45–64, and 13.8% were 65 and older. The median age was 38 years. For every 100 females, there were 111.2 males. For every 100 females age 18 and over, there were 108.3 males.

The town's median household income was $38,000, and the median family income $39,375. Males had a median income of $31,250 versus $18,333 for females. The per capita income was $15,054.  About 9.6% of families and 8.6% of the population were below the poverty line, including 11.5% of those under 18 and none of those 65 or over.

References

External links 
 Town of Hiles Official Website
 1852 plat map covering town of Hiles
 1879 plat map
 1896 plat map
 1909 plat map
 1928 plat map
 1956 plat map

Towns in Wood County, Wisconsin
Towns in Wisconsin